Fayence-Tourrettes Airfield  is a small airfield located  south of Fayence and Tourrettes, both communes of the Var department in the Provence-Alpes-Côte d'Azur region of southeastern France.

History
On 13 June 1940, 12 Italian fighters FIAT CR.42, from 151° Gruppo of 53° Stormo, of Regia Aeronautica, attacked the airfield, destroying several aircraft on the ground.

Nowadays, it is home to a large gliding club, the Association Aéronautique Provence Côte d'Azur (AAPCA) and to one microlight school. Runway 10L has two small tarmac landing strips for the exclusive use of gliders.

References

Bibliography

 
 De Marchi, Italo. Fiat CR.42 Falco (in Italian). Modena, Italy: Stem Mucchi, 1994. No ISBN.
 Sgarlato, Nico. Fiat CR.42 (in Italian). Parma, Italy: Delta Editrice, 2005.
 Skulski, Przemysław. Fiat CR.42 Falco. Redbourn, UK: Mushroom Model Publications, 2007. .

External links
 Association Aéronautique Provence Côte d'Azur (AAPCA)

Airports in Provence-Alpes-Côte d'Azur
Airports established in 1934
1934 establishments in France